Where may refer to:

 Where?, one of the Five Ws in journalism
 where (command), a shell command
 Where (SQL), a database language clause
 Where.com, a provider of location-based applications via mobile phones
 Where (magazine), a series of magazines for tourists
 "Where?", a song by Nickelback from the album Curb, 1996

See also
Ware (disambiguation)
Wear (disambiguation)
Were (disambiguation)